Pinhal may refer to:

Brazil
Pinhal, Rio Grande do Sul, a municipality
Pinhal Grande, Rio Grande do Sul, a municipality
Pinhal de São Bento, Paraná
Pinhal da Serra, Rio Grande do Sul
Balneário Pinhal, Rio Grande do Sul, a municipality
Espírito Santo do Pinhal, São Paulo, a municipality
Pinhal River, a river in Rio Grande do Sul

Portugal
Pinhal Novo, a parish in the municipality of Palmela 
Pinhal Litoral
Pinhal Interior Norte
Pinhal Interior Sul

China
El Piñal, named Pinhal in Portuguese, a former Spanish trading port

See also
 
 Pinhalão, Paraná, Brazil